Buddika Sanjeewa (born 23 March 1987) is a Sri Lankan cricketer. He made his first-class debut for Badureliya Sports Club in the 2007–08 Premier Trophy on 20 March 2008.

References

External links
 

1987 births
Living people
Sri Lankan cricketers
Badureliya Sports Club cricketers